Christopher Edward Clarke (born 18 December 1980) is an English footballer who plays as a defender.

Career
Born in Leeds, West Yorkshire, Clarke started his career with the Wolverhampton Wanderers youth system alongside his twin brother Matthew and after being released by the club the pair signed for Third Division outfit Halifax Town in July 1999. He left the club in February 2002 after signing for Second Division side Blackpool on a two-and-a-half-year contract with the option of an additional year for a fee of £120,000 plus a sell-on clause. Clarke made his debut in a 3–0 victory at Cambridge United on 26 February. He scored Blackpool's second goal with a header in the 2002 Football League Trophy Final at the Millennium Stadium, which the team went on to win 4–1 against Cambridge. He joined Cambridge of the Third Division on a free transfer after signing a contract until the end of the 2003–04 season on 25 March 2004.

After training with York City he signed for the newly-relegated Conference National side on a one-year contract on 16 July. After making five appearances for the club. He was allowed to leave the club on a free transfer on 22 October. He subsequently re-signed for former club Halifax, now in the Conference. He made his debut in a 3–1 defeat to Chester City in an FA Cup second round game on 4 December. Having made three appearances for Halifax, Clarke joined Conference rivals Leigh RMI on a one-month loan on 18 February 2005. He was described by manager Steve Bleasdale as a "key acquisition" and after making four appearances he returned to Halifax. Having made another three appearances for Halifax he was released at the end of the 2004–05 season.

He signed for Northern Premier League Premier Division side Guiseley during the summer. Clarke left the club early in the 2006–07 season to sign for Northern Premier League First Division side Bradford Park Avenue. He played for Park Avenue in their 3–0 defeat to Eastwood Town in the play-off semi-final in April 2007.

Career statistics

Footnotes

A.  The "League" column constitutes appearances and goals (including those as a substitute) in the Football League, Football Conference and Northern Premier League.
B.  The "Other" column constitutes appearances and goals (including those as a substitute) in the FA Trophy and Football League Trophy.

References

External links

1980 births
Living people
Footballers from Leeds
English footballers
Association football defenders
Wolverhampton Wanderers F.C. players
Halifax Town A.F.C. players
Blackpool F.C. players
Cambridge United F.C. players
York City F.C. players
Leigh Genesis F.C. players
Guiseley A.F.C. players
Bradford (Park Avenue) A.F.C. players
English Football League players
National League (English football) players
Twin sportspeople
English twins